Michael Robert Hamilton Holmes à Court (27 July 1937 – 2 September 1990) was a South African-born Australian businessman who became Australia's first billionaire, before dying suddenly of a heart attack in 1990 at the age of 53.

A great-great-grandson of William Holmes à Court, 2nd Baron Heytesbury, and a grand-nephew of William Frederick Holmes à Court, 3rd Baron Heytesbury, Holmes à Court was one of the world's most feared corporate raiders through the 1980s, having built his empire single-handedly from virtually nothing to a diversified resources and media group with an estimated value immediately before the 1987 stock market crash of about A$2 billion. Shareholders in the company enjoyed enormous investment growth. 1984 saw Robert Holmes à Court's horse Black Knight win the Melbourne Cup with a time of 3 minutes 18.19 seconds.

Holmes à Court died intestate, and his estate was to be divided one-third for his widow Janet (née Ranford), and the remainder equally among their four children, who include Peter and Simon.

Early life

Holmes à Court was born in Johannesburg but spent much of his early life in Southern Rhodesia (now Zimbabwe). He was educated at Cordwalles Preparatory School and Michaelhouse School in Natal, South Africa. There he earned money selling his schoolmates photographs he had taken of them, and by driving them home in exchange for their travel allowances.

Holmes à Court studied forestry at the University of Auckland and Massey University, where he graduated with a Bachelor of Agricultural Science in 1962. He then moved to Perth, Western Australia in 1961 to study law at the University of Western Australia, where he graduated with a Bachelor of Laws in 1965. He married science teacher Janet Ranford on 18 May 1966. Holmes à Court was admitted to practise on 17 April 1968. He then worked as a barrister and solicitor. His law practice in Perth was sometimes in partnership with Nicholas Hasluck.

Business career 

Holmes à Court entered the corporate stage by accident in 1970, when his law firm was asked to act as administrative receiver of a small publicly listed company, Western Australian Worsted & Woollen Mills (later Albany Woollen Mills, also known as AWM or WA Wool). The company was the single largest employer in the regional city of Albany. In what he later described as his most challenging "takeover", probably because it was his first, he found a way to invest $500,000 in the ailing business, on the proviso that the state Minister for Industry, Sir Charles Court, would persuade the Government of Western Australia to forgive the $500,000 in loans they had made.

The source of funds for his initial investment in WA Wool were never made clear, since the $75,000 deposit for the purchase price of WA Wool shares came from a bank account that he shared with the partners in his law firm at the time, and his partners asked for these funds to be repaid. Nevertheless, since Holmes à Court had no other apparent source of income at the time, a possibility is that his mother Ethnee financed his first foray into business, since she had stood to inherit from her mother Florence, who in turn had stood to inherit from her second husband H.R. Cumming, a wealthy Rhodesian landowner, businessman and colleague of Cecil Rhodes. Cumming had helped raise Ethnee during her childhood on his estate outside Gweru. As an adult and while living in Rhodesia and South Africa, Ethnee had also established and sold both a riding school and a game lodge in Chobe, and eventually sold several properties that she owned as investments giving the funds to Robert to manage on her migration to Australia in 1967.

After acquiring WA Wool, Holmes à Court made it more competitive by reducing production costs, mainly by installing the latest wool milling and weaving machinery. This was acquired on favourable terms from a leading Belgian equipment manufacturer, which was keen to enter the Australian market at that time. He now controlled a company listed on the Australian Stock Exchange, and from there he began to gain control of a string of small businesses, including Westate Electrical Industries.

The Bell Group

In 1973, Holmes à Court's AWM acquired Bell Brothers, a well-known West Australian transport and contracting group, for $9.6 million, through a reverse takeover. Bell Brothers would ultimately become his flagship company as The Bell Group Ltd.

Bell Group acquired media interests including the Albany Advertiser, the Katanning weekly, the Great Southern Herald, the Collie Mail and radio station 6VA. It also made unsuccessful bids for companies such as Griffin Coal, Greenbushes Tin and Emu Wines. These bids, while unsuccessful, earned significant profits mainly by aggressive defences from owners resulting in inflated share prices held by the bidder.

In 1977, Holmes à Court's brother Simon disappeared in mysterious circumstances in Africa. His abandoned car was found more than 1,000 km from his home and where he was last seen in Botswana. Author Geoff Elliott wrote a book about the disappearance.

During 1979, Bell Group made an unsuccessful bid for Ansett Transport Industries but was defeated by Rupert Murdoch and roadfreight group TNT. However, a profit of $11 million was made by Bell for future bids.

Bell Group made an unsuccessful bid for The Times in 1980, and at the same time launched a new Perth newspaper, the Western Mail, challenging the Herald & Weekly Times group which owned The West Australian. By the end of 1980, Bell Group had accumulated cash reserves of $100 million.

In 1981, it made a bid for Elders Goldsbrough Mort for $120 million bid and failed, but earned a profit of $16.5 million on the deal.

During 1982, Bell Group took stakes in Rolls-Royce and Portland cement and made an unsuccessful bid for The Herald and Weekly Times group. Later that year it acquired Perth television station TVW-7.

Bell Group subsequently acquired a television station in Adelaide and a handful of small regional radio stations.

Unsuccessful bids were made for Carlton & United Breweries and Elders IXL but, as usual, Holmes à Court's strategic corporate planning let him walk away with a profit.

Bell Group acted as a "white knight" in defeating a £1.9 billion hostile bid from Lloyds Bank for its competitor Standard Chartered Bank.

In 1982 board room coup it acquired Lew Grade's UK-based Associated Communications Corporation (ACC), and then sold off ACC's stake in Central Independent Television and ATV Music publishing interests, including Northern Songs, a company set up by the Beatles to control copyright of their music. ATV Music Publishing was bought by Michael Jackson, and as part of the deal, Holmes à Court persuaded Jackson to make a brief visit to Perth, to appear on Channel 7's annual Telethon.

In 1987, Bell Group purchased a stake in Pioneer Concrete and made a second unsuccessful bid for the Herald & Weekly Times group. The bid went to takeover competitor Rupert Murdoch for $1.8 billion. Bell Group took ownership of The West Australian, Perth's main daily newspaper.

Australian Consolidated Investments

Australian Consolidated Investments, was previously known as Bell Resources between 1984 and 1990 and prior to that the company was known as Wigmores between 1938 and 1984.
 
In 1983, Bell Group bought Perth mining equipment company Wigmores, and was renamed Bell Resources Ltd. Through the ACC group, BRL gained control of Bass Strait oil and gas explorer, Weeks Petroleum which owned a 2.5% royalty share in the Esso-BHP consortium.

In 1985, BRL acquired 13% of U.S. mining company Asarco for $140 million and made an unsuccessful bid for Perth utility Fremantle Gas & Coke. Also in 1985, BRL made its biggest and most daring bid to date for control of resources and steelmaking giant BHP, which was Australia's largest company. Before the deal was finalised the following year, Elders IXL took a 20% stake in BHP, for $2 billion. In turn, BHP purchased $1 billion of Elders preference shares. The deal later resulted in action against Elders executives, including chairman John Elliott by the corporate regulator. BRL also spent US$800 million, to acquire 9.6% of Texaco stock.

Black Monday

By the time of the October 1987 international stockmarket crash, Bell Group had accumulated assets that were valuable but not generating revenue sufficient to cover debts. Holmes à Court's family company, Heytesbury Holdings, at the time owned 43% of Bell Group, which in turn owned 40% of the cash rich Bell Resources. However, Bell Resources was not able to buy its parent, due to share raids being made on Bell Resources by Kerry Packer, Adelaide Steamship Company (under John Spalvins) and IEL (Ron Brierley). Merrill Lynch withdrew its $1 billion line of credit facility, meaning that the parent couldn't acquire its subsidiary and thereby access the money.

Takeover by Bond Corporation and SGIC

Holmes à Court initially disposed of some Perth properties before accepting a joint takeover by Bond Corporation and the State Government Insurance Commission (SGIC), in which both parties took a 19.9% stake in Bell Group. Holmes à Court retained 6% of Bell Group and received $340 million from the sale. Bond Corp was subsequently forced to bid for other shares in Bell with the result that it ended up with a majority shareholding of 68% of Bell Group. Bond Corp then proceeded to strip $500 million from Bell Resources in an effort to prop up its own debts. The asset stripping included transferring cash from Bell Resources Ltd for its own purposes (thus breaching the company code and ultimately sending its chairman Alan Bond to jail), transfer of ownership of newspaper holdings into Bond Media and disposal of certain assets including TVW-7.

During 1988, Holmes à Court concentrated on the rebuilding and expansion of his Heytesbury subsidiaries acquiring Stoll Moss Theatres in London, Sherwin Pastoral Co (owner of vast cattle stations in Northern Australia), and the Vasse Felix winery in Margaret River.

In 1989, Heytesbury bought the Victoria River Downs and major Sherwin Pastoral Co cattle and pastoral stations. Holmes à Court also traded in Jaguar stock, as well as Christie's and New Zealand media group Wilson & Horton.

During 1990, Bell Resources was renamed Australian Consolidated Investments Limited. Also Bond Corporation announced a record $980m loss and Elders IXL followed with an announcement of a $1.3 billion loss. Bond Corporation entered a scheme of arrangement in 1991, with receivers taking charge of the Bell Group. In 2002, Australian Consolidated Investments was delisted from the ASX.

Death

A heavy smoker who suffered from diabetes, Holmes à Court died of a heart attack in bed on the morning of 2 September 1990. Holmes à Court died intestate and his estate was to be divided one-third for his widow Janet (née Ranford), and the remainder equally among their four children. Heytesbury Holdings continues as one of the largest private companies in Australia. Janet Holmes à Court ran Heytesbury from the time of her husband's death until 2005, when she retired. She was, at one time, Australia's richest woman. The couple's eldest son, Peter Holmes à Court, is now a major investor and entrepreneur in his own right, after divesting himself of his share of Heytesbury, reported as A$35 million. Peter Holmes à Court, along with Russell Crowe, is the 75.8% owner of National Rugby League club South Sydney Rabbitohs. Another son, Paul Holmes à Court, has since taken over as chief executive. Robert Holmes à Court's other children are Simon, who is an academic focused on environment and climate and founder of climate fund Climate 200, and Catherine (married, with four children). Holmes à Court's mother Ethnee died at the age of 98 in May 2014.

Robert and Janet Holmes à Court had 12 grandchildren by 2005, according to an interview with her.

Notes

References

Further reading
Edgar, Patricia (1999). Janet Holmes à Court. Australia. HarperCollins. . The official biography of Robert Holmes à Court's wife.
Business Review Weekly, 5 September 1986, p 47, 12 September 1986, p 55, 19 September 1986, p 17, 26 September 1986, p 51, 3 October 1986, p 47
Australian Financial Review, 3 September 1990, p 1
The Australian, 3 September 1990, p 1
The West Australian, 3 September 1990, p 1
The Bulletin, 11 September 1990, p 166
J. McIlwraith, 'Holmes à Court: The End of an Era', Australian Business, 12 September 1990, p 32
Australian, 6–7 Apr 1991, 'Review', p 1.

1937 births
1990 deaths
Alumni of Michaelhouse
Australian art collectors
Australian billionaires
Australian people of British descent
Australian racehorse owners and breeders
Corporate raiders
Holmes à Court family
Massey University alumni
People from Johannesburg
People from Perth, Western Australia
South African emigrants to Australia
University of Western Australia alumni